Dos a quererse is a Mexican telenovela produced by Televisa S.A. de C.V in 1977. Starring by Chela Castro and Julio Alemán.

Is an adaptation of the Argentine telenovela Dos a quererse produced in 1963.

Cast 
 Chela Castro
 Julio Alemán
 Hilda Aguirre
 Rosa Gloria Chagoyán

References

External links 

Mexican telenovelas
1977 telenovelas
Televisa telenovelas
Spanish-language telenovelas
1977 Mexican television series debuts
1977 Mexican television series endings